Elmwood is an unincorporated community in Pickaway County, in the U.S. state of Ohio.

History
Elmwood had its start in 1878 when the railroad was extended to that point.

References

Unincorporated communities in Pickaway County, Ohio
Unincorporated communities in Ohio